Sterile alpha motif domain-containing protein 9 is a protein that in humans is encoded by the SAMD9 gene.  Mutations in this gene cause MIRAGE syndrome.

References

Further reading